Mikhail Bulgakov Museum (officially known as Literature-Memorial Museum to Mikhail Bulgakov, commonly called the Bulgakov House or Lystovnychyi House) is a museum in Kyiv, Ukraine, dedicated to Kyiv-born Russian writer Mikhail Bulgakov.

Commenced in February 1989, and opened on May 15, 1991 for the 100th anniversary of the writer's birth, the museum is located at №13 on the Andriivskyi Descent and contains an exposition of nearly 2500 pieces that include Bulgakov's belongings, books, postcards, and photos – conveying the life and creativity of the writer and his surroundings. The atmosphere of the house reflects the writer's life – as a secondary school pupil, student of medicine, family doctor, and writer—when Bulgakov wrote The White Guard, The Master and Margarita, and Theatre Love Story.

The building was erected in 1888 and designed by architect N. Gardenin, and thoroughly renovated before the opening of the museum. A memorial plaque with Bulgakov's portrait hangs on the front of the building. The White Guard novel makes vivid references to the Andriyivskyy Descent, and the current plaque of the address at №13 displays the street name the writer used in his book (№13 ). Inna Konchakovskaia (1902–85), daughter of the owner (who was a hero of that Bulgakov novel) and niece of composer Witold Maliszewski, preserved this unique house for Kyiv in the hard Soviet times. 

The museum staff conducts considerable studies and research, publishes unreleased material, and holds book-club meetings.

In June 2014, the museum posted the following announcement: "All persons supportive of the military occupation of Ukraine are discouraged from visiting the museum - The Mikhail Bulgakov Museum Administration."

Following the 2022 Russian invasion of Ukraine, there were calls in Ukraine to close down the museum, since Bulgakov allegedly opposed Ukrainian statehood and can not be considered Ukrainian writer. Oleksandr Tkachenko, the culture minister, as well as Liudmyla Gubianuri, the museum director, opposed the calls.

See also
 Bulgakov museum in Moscow
 Heart of a Dog
 The Master and Margarita

https://bulgakovmuseum.com/
https://bulgakovmuseum.com/history

References

Museums in Kyiv
Mikhail Bulgakov
Biographical museums in Ukraine
Literary museums in Ukraine
Andriyivskyy Descent
National Landmarks in Kyiv